This is a list of episodes of the Genesis of Aquarion anime series, produced by studio Satelight and directed by Shoji Kawamori with music compositions by Yoko Kanno.  The series was broadcast in Japan on TV Tokyo between April 4, 2005, and September 26, 2005, and is available online in English on Funimation Channel.

Two pieces of music were used as opening themes,  for the first seventeen episodes and "Go Tight!" for episode eighteen onwards, performed by AKINO. Three pieces of music were used as ending themes, by Yui Makino, by AKINO and "Celiane" by Gabriela Robin.

Episode list

Genesis of Aquarion
Genesis of Aquarion